Stary Buzdyak (İśke Büzdäk) is a rural locality (a selo) in Urtakulsky Selsoviet, Buzdyaksky District, Bashkortostan, Russia. The population was 484 as of 2010. There are 15 streets.

Geography 
Stary Buzdyak is located 6 km north of Buzdyak (the district's administrative centre) by road. Buzdyak is the nearest rural locality.

References 

Rural localities in Buzdyaksky District